Willian Sarôa de Souza (born 18 September 1987 in São Paulo, São Paulo state) is a Brazilian footballer who plays for Liechtenstein's only professional club FC Vaduz at Swiss Super League

Career
He moved to Vaduz on 1 July 2008.

Willian Sarôa played for Campeonato Paulista Série A2 side Associação Atlética Flamengo during 2009, before moving to Paulista Futebol Clube at the beginning of 2010. He would make five Campeonato Paulista appearances for Paulista before going on loan to Paulista rivals Ituiutaba Esporte Clube in February 2010.

References

External links
Profile at Soccerway
 Profile at Fairplay Agency
 FC Vaduz profile 

1987 births
Living people
Brazilian footballers
Associação Atlética Flamengo players
Paulista Futebol Clube players
Boa Esporte Clube players
FC Vaduz players
Footballers from São Paulo
Expatriate footballers in Liechtenstein
Association football forwards
Brazilian expatriate footballers
Brazilian expatriate sportspeople in Liechtenstein